Chabab Riadhi Béni Thour, known as CR Béni Thour or CRBT for short, is an Algerian football club based in Ouargla. The club was founded in 1990 and its colours are green and white. Their home stadium, the Olympic Ouargla Stadium, has a capacity of 18,000 spectators. The club is currently playing in the Algerian Ligue 2.

In 2000, the club won the Algerian Cup by defeating WA Tlemcen 2–1 in the final.

On August 5, 2020, RC Kouba promoted to the Algerian Ligue 2.

Honours
Algerian Cup
Winner (1): 2000

Performance in CAF competitions
CAF Cup Winners' Cup: 1 appearance
2001 – Second Round

References

Football clubs in Algeria
Ouargla Province
1990 establishments in Algeria
Sports clubs in Algeria